The 113th district of the Texas House of Representatives contains parts of Garland, Rowlett, and Mesquite. The current Representative is Rhetta Andrews Bowers, who has represented the district since 2019.

References 

113